Wilfredo Salas (October 6, 1922 – August 14, 1956) was a Cuban pitcher in the Negro leagues and the Mexican League.

A native of Guantánamo, Cuba, Salas played for the New York Cubans in 1948, and during the same season also played minor league baseball with the Sherbrooke Athletics. He played the majority of his career in the Mexican League, where he spent several seasons between 1946 and 1956. Salas died in Calpulalpan, Mexico in 1956 at age 33.

References

External links
 and Seamheads

1922 births
1956 deaths
New York Cubans players
Cuban expatriates in the United States
Cuban expatriates in Mexico